The Office of Management and Budget (OMB) is the largest office within the Executive Office of the President of the United States (EOP). OMB's most prominent function is to produce the president's budget, but it also examines agency programs, policies, and procedures to see whether they comply with the president's policies and coordinates inter-agency policy initiatives.

Shalanda Young became OMB's acting director in March 2021, and was confirmed by the Senate in March 2022.

History

The Bureau of the Budget, OMB's predecessor, was established in 1921 as a part of the Department of the Treasury by the Budget and Accounting Act of 1921, which President Warren G. Harding signed into law. The Bureau of the Budget was moved to the Executive Office of the President in 1939 and was run by Harold D. Smith during the government's rapid expansion of spending during World War II. James L. Sundquist, a staffer at the Bureau of the Budget, called the relationship between the president and the bureau extremely close and subsequent bureau directors politicians, not public administrators.

The bureau was reorganized into the Office of Management and Budget in 1970 during the Nixon administration. The first OMB included Roy Ash (head), Paul O'Neill (assistant director), Fred Malek (deputy director), Frank Zarb (associate director) and two dozen others.

In the 1990s, OMB was reorganized to remove the distinction between management staff and budgetary staff by combining the dual roles into each given program examiner within the Resource Management Offices.

Purpose
OMB prepares the president's budget proposal to Congress and supervises the administration of the executive branch agencies. It evaluates the effectiveness of agency programs, policies, and procedures, assesses competing funding demands among agencies, and sets funding priorities. OMB ensures that agency reports, rules, testimony, and proposed legislation are consistent with the president's budget and administration policies.

OMB also oversees and coordinates the administration's procurement, financial management, information, and regulatory policies. In each of these areas, OMB's role is to help improve administrative management, develop better performance measures and coordinating mechanisms, and reduce unnecessary burdens on the public.

OMB's critical missions are:

Budget development and execution, a prominent government-wide process managed from the Executive Office of the President (EOP) and a device by which a president implements their policies, priorities, and actions in everything from the Department of Defense to NASA.
Managing other agencies' financials, paperwork, and IT.

Structure

Overview
OMB is made up mainly of career appointed staff who provide continuity across changes of party and administration in the White House. Six positions within OMBthe Director, the Deputy Director, the Deputy Director for Management, and the administrators of the Office of Information and Regulatory Affairs, the Office of Federal Procurement Policy, and the Office of Federal Financial Managementare presidentially appointed and Senate-confirmed positions.

OMB's largest components are the five Resource Management Offices, which are organized along functional lines mirroring the federal government, each led by an OMB associate director. Approximately half of all OMB staff are assigned to these offices, the majority of whom are designated as program examiners. Program examiners can be assigned to monitor one or more federal agencies or may be deployed by a topical area, such as monitoring issues relating to U.S. Navy warships. These staff have dual responsibility for both management and budgetary issues, as well as for giving expert advice on all aspects relating to their programs. Each year they review federal agency budget requests and help decide what resource requests will be sent to Congress as part of the president's budget. They perform in-depth program evaluations with the Program Assessment Rating Tool, review proposed regulations and agency testimony, analyze pending legislation, and oversee the aspects of the president's management agenda including agency management scorecards. They are often called upon to provide analysis information to EOP staff. They also provide important information to those assigned to the statutory offices within OMB: the Office of Information and Regulatory Affairs, the Office of Federal Procurement Policy, the Office of Federal Financial Management, and the Office of E-Government & Information Technology, which specializes in issues such as federal regulations and procurement policy and law.

Other components are OMB-wide support offices, including the Office of General Counsel, the Office of Legislative Affairs, the Budget Review Division (BRD), and the Legislative Reference Division. The BRD performs government-wide budget coordination and is largely responsible for the technical aspects relating to the release of the president's budget each February. With respect to the estimation of spending for the executive branch, the BRD serves a purpose parallel to that of the Congressional Budget Office (which was created in response to the OMB) for estimating Congressional spending, the Department of the Treasury for estimating executive branch revenue, and the Joint Committee on Taxation for estimating Congressional revenue.

The Legislative Reference Division is the federal government's central clearing house for proposed legislation or testimony by federal officials. It distributes proposed legislation and testimony to all relevant federal reviewers and distills the comments into a consensus opinion of the administration about the proposal. It is also responsible for writing an Enrolled Bill Memorandum to the president once a bill is presented by both chambers of Congress for the president's signature. The Enrolled Bill Memorandum details the bill's particulars, opinions on the bill from relevant federal departments, and an overall opinion about whether it should be signed into law or vetoed. It also issues Statements of Administration Policy that let Congress know the White House's official position on proposed legislation.

Role in the executive budget process
In practice, the president has assigned the OMB certain responsibilities when it comes to the budget and hiring authorities who play key roles in developing it. OMB coordinates the development of the president's budget proposal by issuing circulars, memoranda, and guidance documents to the heads of executive agencies. The OMB works very closely with executive agencies in making sure the budget process and proposal is smooth.

The development of the budget within the executive branch has many steps and takes nearly a year to complete. The first step is the OMB informing the president of the country's economic situation. The next step is known as the Spring Guidance: the OMB gives executive agencies instructions on policy guidance to use when coming up with their budget requests along with due dates for them to submit their requests. The OMB then works with the agencies to discuss issues in the upcoming budget. In July, the OMB issues circular A-11 to all agencies, which outlines instructions for submitting the budget proposals, which the agencies submit by September. The fiscal year begins October1 and OMB staff meet with senior agency representatives to find out whether their proposals are in line with the president's priorities and policies and identify constraints within the budget proposal until late November. The OMB director then meets with the president and EOP advisors to discuss the agencies' budget proposals and recommends a federal budget proposal, and the agencies are notified of the decisions about their requests. They can appeal to OMB and the president in December if they are dissatisfied with the decisions. After working together to resolve issues, agencies and OMB prepare a budget justification document to present to relevant congressional committees, especially the Appropriations Committee. Finally, by the first Monday in February, the president must review and submit the final budget to Congress to approve.

OMB is also responsible for the preparation of Statements of Administrative Policy (SAPs) with the president. These statements allow the OMB to communicate the president's and agencies' policies to the government as a whole and set forth policymakers' agendas. During the review of the federal budget, interest groups can lobby for policy change and affect the budget for the new year. OMB plays a key role in policy conflicts by making sure legislation and agencies' actions are consistent with the executive branch's. OMB has a powerful and influential role in the government, basically making sure its day-to-day operations run. Without a budget, federal employees could not be paid, federal buildings could not open and federal programs would come to a halt in a government shutdown. Shutdowns can occur when Congress refuses to accept a budget.

Suspension and debarment
The Interagency Suspension and Debarment Committee (ISDC) was created as an OMB committee by President Ronald Reagan's Executive Order 12549 in 1986, for the purpose of monitoring the implementation of the order. This order mandates executive departments and agencies to:
participate in a government-wide suspension and debarment system,
issue regulations with government-wide criteria and minimum due process procedures when debarring or suspending participants, and
send debarred and suspended participants' identifying information to the General Services Administration for inclusion on a list of excluded persons, now known as the System for Award Management (SAM).

Circulars

Circulars are instructions or information the OMB issues to federal agencies that are indexed by major category: Budget, State and Local Governments, Educational and Non-Profit Institutions, Federal Procurement, Federal Financial Management, Federal Information Resources / Data Collection and Other Special Purpose.

Circular NO. A-119
Circular A-119 is for federal participation in the development and use of voluntary consensus standards and in conformity assessment activities. A-119 instructs its agencies to adopt voluntary consensus standards before relying upon industry standards and reducing to a minimum the reliance by agencies on government standards. Adoption of international standards is widely followed by U.S. agencies. This includes:
 Environmental Protection Agency referencing ISO 14001 supporting public policy in environmental management
 Department of Energy referencing ISO 50001 supporting public policy for energy performance aligned with the International Energy Agency
 Department of Labor referencing ISO 45001 supporting public policy in occupational health and safety
 Food and Drug Administration referencing ISO 13485 supporting public policy in medical devices
 Food and Drug Administration referencing ISO 22000 supporting public policy in food products

Organization
Director of the Office of Management and Budget
Deputy Director, OMB
Executive Associate Director of OMB
Office of General Counsel
Office of Legislative Affairs
Office of Communications
Office of Economic Policy (EP)
Management and Operations Division
Legislative Reference Division
Budget Review Division (BRD)
Resource Management Offices
Natural Resource Programs
Education, Income Maintenance, and Labor Programs
Health Programs
General Government Programs
National Security Programs
Deputy Director for Management (Chief Performance Officer of the United States)
Office of Performance and Personnel Management (OPPM)
Office of Federal Financial Management (OFFM)
Office of Federal Procurement Policy (OFPP)
Office of E-Government & Information Technology (administrator: Federal Chief Information Officer of the United States) 
Cyber and National Security Unit
United States Digital Service (USDS)
Office of Information and Regulatory Affairs (OIRA)
Office of the Intellectual Property Enforcement Coordinator (IPEC)

Current appointees
Director: Shalanda Young
Deputy Director: Nani Coloretti
Chief of Staff for OMB: Rachel Wallace
General Counsel: Daniel Jacobson
Deputy Director for Management (Chief Performance Officer of the United States): Jason Miller
Controller of the Office of Federal Financial Management: John C. Pasquantino (Acting)
Administrator of the Office of Federal Procurement Policy: Lesley A. Field (Acting)
Administrator of the Office of E-Government & Information Technology (Federal Chief Information Officer of the United States): Clare Martorana
Made in America Director: Livia Shmavonian
Administrator of the Office of Information and Regulatory Affairs: Richard L. ("Ricky") Revesz

List of directors

See also

List of federal agencies in the United States
Learning agenda
United States Census Bureau
List of U.S. states and territories by population
List of metropolitan areas of the United States
List of United States cities by population
List of United States counties and county-equivalents
Primary statistical area (list)
Combined statistical area (list)
Core-based statistical area (list)
Metropolitan statistical area (list)
Micropolitan statistical area (list)
United States urban area (list)
Title 2 of the Code of Federal Regulations
Title 5 of the Code of Federal Regulations
United States federal budget
Office of Federal Financial Management
Office of Federal Procurement Policy
Government procurement in the United States
Office of E-Government & Information Technology
Office of Information and Regulatory Affairs
Data.gov
USAFacts

Notes

References

External links

Office of Management and Budget in the Federal Register
Budget of the United States government and supplements, 1923–present
Death and Taxes: 2009 A visual guide and infographic of the 2009 United States federal discretionary budget request as prepared by OMB
"The Decision Makers: Office of Management and Budget" GovExec.com, August 22, 2005

United States Office of Management and Budget
Management and budget
United States administrative law
United States federal budgets
Cabinet of the United States
Government agencies established in 1970